Vlasta is a woman’s  name. The Slavic base of the word, vlast, means homeland. It is also the short form of the masculine names Vlastimil and Vlastislav.

Name Day 
In the Czech calendar: December 23
In the Slovak calendar: February 19

Famous bearers 
Vlasta Burian, Czech actor
Vlasta Chramostová, Czech actress
Vlasta Děkanová, Czechoslovak/Czech gymnast
Vlasta Fabianová, Czech actress
Vlasta Foltová, Czechoslovak/Czech gymnast
Vlasta Kálalová, Czech physician
Vlasta Matulová, Czech actress
Vlasta Svátková, Czech actress
Vlasta Parkanová, Czech lawyer and politician
Vlasta Pavić, Croatian politician
Vlasta Průchová
Vlasta Štěpová, Czech economist and politician
Vlasta Velisavljevi%C4%87, Serbian actor
Vlasta Vrana, Canadian-Norwegian `actor

See also 
Vlasta (disambiguation)

External links 
 Četnost jmen na stránkách MV ČR

Feminine given names
Czech feminine given names
Czech masculine given names
Croatian feminine given names
Slovak feminine given names